Jabłonka may refer to the following places:
Jabłonka, Lesser Poland Voivodeship (south Poland)
Jabłonka, Łódź Voivodeship (central Poland)
Jabłonka, Subcarpathian Voivodeship (south-east Poland)
Jabłonka, Greater Poland Voivodeship (west-central Poland)
Jabłonka, Lubusz Voivodeship (west Poland)
Jabłonka, Opole Voivodeship (south-west Poland)
Jabłonka, Pomeranian Voivodeship (north Poland)
Jabłonka, Nidzica County in Warmian-Masurian Voivodeship (north Poland)
Jabłonka, Ostróda County in Warmian-Masurian Voivodeship (north Poland)
Jabłonka, Szczytno County in Warmian-Masurian Voivodeship (north Poland)

See also

Jablonka (disambiguation)